The 1986 Intercontinental Final was the twelfth running of the Intercontinental Final as part of the qualification for the 1986 Speedway World Championship. The 1986 Final was run on 20 July at the Odsal Stadium in Bradford, England, and was the last qualifying stage for riders from Scandinavia, the USA and from the Commonwealth nations for the World Final to be held at the Silesian Stadium in Chorzów, Poland.

Intercontinental Final
 20 July
  Bradford, Odsal Stadium
 Qualification: Top 11 plus 1 reserve to the World Final in Chorzów, Poland

* Paul Thorp replaced Kelly Moran. Phil Crump came in as a reserve

Classification

References

See also
 Motorcycle Speedway

1986
World Individual